Omokcheon station is a railroad station on the Suin-Bundang Line of the Seoul Metropolitan Subway in Suwon, Gyeonggi Province, South Korea. It opened on 12 September 2020.

References

Metro stations in Suwon
Railway stations opened in 2020
Seoul Metropolitan Subway stations
2020 establishments in South Korea